The Nacatoch Sand is a geologic formation in Arkansas. It preserves fossils dating back to the Cretaceous period.

See also

 List of fossiliferous stratigraphic units in Arkansas
 Paleontology in Arkansas

References
 

Cretaceous Arkansas
Cretaceous geology of Texas